Christophe Ossvald was a general of brigade (1794) in the French Revolutionary Wars. He was born 25 March 1737 in the town of Sarralbe (Moselle) "departement", and was named chef de brigade of the 10th Regiment of Cuirassiers on 21 March 1794.

He appointed on the rank of "général de brigede" on June 22, 1794.He participated in the invasion of southwestern Germany and Switzerland with the Army of the Danube in 1799, in which he was assigned to the Artillery Park, under command of Jean Ambroise Baston de Lariboisière. Date and place of death unknown.

French military personnel of the French Revolutionary Wars
1737 births
Year of death missing
French generals